State Road 35 (SR 35) is a north–south state highway in the western counties of the U.S. state of Florida.

Route description
It is mainly signed as a hidden route along U.S. Highways:
U.S. Route 17: Punta Gorda to Bartow.
U.S. Route 98: Zolfo Springs to Trilacoochee (which also carries hidden SR 700).
U.S. Route 301: south of Dade City to Belleview

In Bartow, SR 35 turns west and follows East Main Street, before turning north again on North Broadway Avenue, and rejoining US 98 again at SR 60 (Van Fleet Drive).

Evidence of SR 35's existence can be found in Hardee County, Florida along County Roads 35A & 35B in Coker, Wauchula, and Zolfo Springs. Polk County's evidence of SR 35's existence can be found with County Road 35A between Lakeland and Providence, and in Pasco County, Florida, evidence of SR 35's existence can be found with County Road 35 Alternate between Branchborough and Dade City. According to some maps, County Road 41 Alternate (Spring Valley Road) was previously known as CR 35B, and was extended to US 98-301 north of Dade City along Frazee Hill Road.

Within Belleview, the road is briefly co-signed with US 27-441 (SR 25-500) then turns right at the eastern terminus of CR 484, where it is signed independently along Southeast Hames Road, and then turns left again at Baseline Road, where it curves north as it leaves the city. While State Road 35 terminates at State Road 40 near the site of the former Wild Waters water park in Silver Springs, the road continues northward as County Road 35 through the intersection with State Road 326, passing through Indian Lake State Forest where it finally terminates at Northeast 90th Street Road and Northeast 97th Street Road.

Major intersections

Related roads

County Road 35 in Marion County

County Road 35 is a northern extension of SR 35. It begins at SR 35 & 40 in Silver Springs and continues north to make a reverse turn before the intersection with SR 326. From there it returns to its previous trajectory then winds through Indian Lake State Forest where it reaches its northern terminus at Northeast 90th Street Road and Northeast 97th Street Road.

County Road 35A in Hardee County

County Road 35A is a suffixed alternate of SR 35. The route runs along Florida Avenue from Florida State Road 64 just west of the Peace River Bridge and Zolfo Springs to US 17 in Coker north of Wauchula.

County Road 35B in Hardee County

County Road 35B is another suffixed alternate of SR 35. The roads have included Terrell Road and Louisiana Street in Wauchula and Metheny Road in Coker.

County Road 35A in Polk County

County Road 35A is a spur of SR 35 in the northwestern Lakeland area. It begins at Interstate 4 and State Road 539 at Exit 31. The route runs along the east side of the CSX Vitis Subdivision until it reaches Kathleen, where it turns straight north. From there it eventually reunites with SR 35.

Pasco County Alternate

County Road 35 Alternate is the bannered route of SR 35 in the southeastern Pasco County. The route begins on Berry Boulevard at County Road 54 in Branchborough just west of the Hillsborough River, and curves to the west onto Melrose Avenue where it approaches Vitis, where CSX's Yeoman Subdivision and Vitis Subdivision merge into the Wildwood Subdivision. The route then turns right onto the Zephyrhills Bypass(CR 535). From there it is named Old Lakeland Highway and follows the west side of the Wildwood Subdivision past an unnumbered interchange with US 98 near Ellerslie, and eventually terminates at US 98/301 in Dade City. Since turns are restricted at this north end, Dick Jarrett Way provides several movements.

Former County Road 35B

Former County Road 35B was shown on some maps as Spring Valley Road between both ends of County Road 41 from north of Dade City to Blanton, and US 98-301 north of Dade City along Payne Road, Fourteenth Street and Frazee Hill Road. Today, Frazee Hill Road, 14th Street, and Payne Road are strictly local streets, and Spring Valley Road is County Road Alternate 41.

References

External links
Florida Route Log (SR 35)

035
035
035
035
035
035
035
035
035
035
035
035
035